The 2014 Hockey East Men's Ice Hockey Tournament was played between March 7 and March 22, 2014 at campus locations and at the TD Garden in Boston, Massachusetts. The Massachusetts–Lowell River Hawks, the defending champions from the 2012–13 season, defeated New Hampshire 4-0 to repeat as champions and became the 7th team in league history to successfully defend their title. Sophomore goalie Connor Hellebuyck was named tournament MVP for his 30-save shutout in the championship match that gave the River Hawks Hockey East's automatic bid into the 2014 NCAA Division I Men's Ice Hockey Tournament.

The tournament is the 30th in league history, as the conference entered its 30th year of existence. It was also the first tournament since 2004 that neither Boston College nor Boston University advanced to at least the semifinals, played at the TD Garden.

Format
With the addition of Notre Dame to Hockey East, the tournament was reformatted to include all eleven teams in the conference. With eleven being an uneven number, an unorthodox format was needed to achieve a tournament that allowed all eleven teams to participate. A fourth, Opening Round was added before the traditional Quarterfinals, which consists of single-elimination games between the 6-11 seeds hosted by the higher seed, with the 1-5 seeds earning a bye to the next round. The 4 and 5 seeds are guaranteed to play each other whereas the 1-3 seeds will play the winners of the 6-11 seed games, with the highest seeds hosting the lowest seeds remaining. The Quarterfinals through Finals are unchanged from the previous season, with the Quarterfinals consisting of a best-of-three series hosted by the higher seeds, while the Semifinals and Final are single games played at the TD Garden. The tournament champion will receive an automatic bid to the NCAA Tournament.

This tournament format will only be used for the 2013-14 season, as the addition of the UConn Huskies to the conference in the 2014–15 season will bring the total number of teams in the league up to twelve, which allows for a more even, 12-team tournament format. The tournament format following this year will change to a best-of-three Opening Round between 5-11 seeds, with 1-4 seeds earning a bye. The Quarterfinals through Finals will be unchanged.

Regular season standings
Note: GP = Games played; W = Wins; L = Losses; T = Ties; PTS = Points; GF = Goals For; GA = Goals Against

Bracket

* denotes overtime periods

Results

Opening Round
On March 7–8 the 6-11 seeds will play in single-elimination games to advance to the best-of-three quarterfinals. Games will be hosted by the higher seeded teams.

Results:

Quarterfinals

(1) Boston College vs. (8) Notre Dame

(2) Massachusetts–Lowell vs. (7) Vermont

(3) Providence vs. (6) Maine

(4) New Hampshire vs. (5) Northeastern

Semifinals

(2) Massachusetts–Lowell vs. (8) Notre Dame

(3) Providence vs. (4) New Hampshire

Championship

(2) Massachusetts–Lowell vs. (4) New Hampshire

Tournament awards

All-Tournament Team
F Kevin Goumas (New Hampshire)
F Joe Pendenza (Massachusetts-Lowell)
F A. J. White (Massachusetts-Lowell)
D Christian Folin (Massachusetts-Lowell)
D Stephen Johns (Notre Dame)
G Connor Hellebuyck* (Massachusetts-Lowell)
* Tournament MVP(s)

Note: Hellebuyck became the first player in the 30-year history of the conference to win the award twice, let alone consecutively. He also became the first goaltender to record a shutout in two title games (winning in 2013-14 by a score of 4–0 and in 2012-13 by a score of 1–0), again in consecutive title games.

External links
2014 Hockey East Men's Ice Hockey Tournament

Hockey East Men's Ice Hockey Tournament
Hockey East Men's Ice Hockey Tournament